This is a partial list of Ukrainian words of Turkic origin.

 chaban: shepherd; from çoban= shepherd
 haydamak: 18th century peasant rebel in Ukraine; another meaning is brigand (highway robber)
 kylym: carpet; from kilim = carpet
 kavun: watermelon; from kavun = melon
 yohurt: yogurt; from yoğurt = yogurt

References

Ukrainian language
Ukrainian words and phrases
Lists of words

ru:Тюркизмы в украинском языке